Leocyma fustina is a moth of the family Nolidae. It is found in Sierra Leone.

References

Moths described in 1893
Chloephorinae